In mathematics, the Radon transform is the integral transform which takes a function f defined on the plane to a function Rf defined on the (two-dimensional) space of lines in the plane, whose value at a particular line is equal to the line integral of the function over that line. The transform was introduced in 1917 by Johann Radon, who also provided a formula for the inverse transform. Radon further included formulas for the transform in three dimensions, in which the integral is taken over planes (integrating over lines is known as the X-ray transform). It was later generalized to higher-dimensional Euclidean spaces and more broadly in the context of integral geometry. The complex analogue of the Radon transform is known as the Penrose transform. The Radon transform is widely applicable to tomography, the creation of an image from the projection data associated with cross-sectional scans of an object.

Explanation
If a function represents an unknown density, then the Radon transform represents the projection data obtained as the output of a tomographic scan.  Hence the inverse of the Radon transform can be used to reconstruct the original density from the projection data, and thus it forms the mathematical underpinning for tomographic reconstruction, also known as iterative reconstruction.

The Radon transform data is often called a sinogram because the Radon transform of an off-center point source is a sinusoid.  Consequently, the Radon transform of a number of small objects appears graphically as a number of blurred sine waves with different amplitudes and phases.

The Radon transform is useful in computed axial tomography (CAT scan), barcode scanners, electron microscopy of macromolecular assemblies like viruses and protein complexes, reflection seismology and in the solution of hyperbolic partial differential equations.

Definition
Let  be a function that satisfies the three regularity conditions:

  is continuous;
 the double integral , extending over the whole plane, converges;
 for any arbitrary point  on the plane it holds that 

It is defined by:

where the integral is taken with respect to the natural hypersurface measure,  (generalizing the  term from the -dimensional case). The X-ray transform is the most widely used special case of this construction, and is obtained by integrating over straight lines.

Relationship with the Fourier transform

The Radon transform is closely related to the Fourier transform. We define the univariate Fourier transform here as:  For a function of a -vector , the univariate Fourier transform is:  For convenience, denote . The Fourier slice theorem then states:  where 

Thus the two-dimensional Fourier transform of the initial function along a line at the inclination angle  is the one variable Fourier transform of the Radon transform (acquired at angle ) of that function. This fact can be used to compute both the Radon transform and its inverse. The result can be generalized into n dimensions:

Dual transform 
The dual Radon transform is a kind of adjoint to the Radon transform.  Beginning with a function g on the space , the dual Radon transform is the function  on Rn defined by: The integral here is taken over the set of all hyperplanes incident with the point , and the measure  is the unique probability measure on the set  invariant under rotations about the point .

Concretely, for the two-dimensional Radon transform, the dual transform is given by:  In the context of image processing, the dual transform is commonly called back-projection as it takes a function defined on each line in the plane and 'smears' or projects it back over the line to produce an image.

Intertwining property
Let  denote the Laplacian on  defined by:This is a natural rotationally invariant second-order differential operator. On , the "radial" second derivative  is also rotationally invariant. The Radon transform and its dual are intertwining operators for these two differential operators in the sense that: In analysing the solutions to the wave equation in multiple spatial dimensions, the intertwining property leads to the translational representation of Lax and Philips. In imaging and numerical analysis this is exploited to reduce multi-dimensional problems into single-dimensional ones, as a dimensional splitting method.

Reconstruction approaches

The process of reconstruction produces the image (or function  in the previous section) from its projection data. Reconstruction is an inverse problem.

Radon inversion formula
In the two-dimensional case, the most commonly used analytical formula to recover  from its Radon transform is the Filtered Back-projection Formula or Radon Inversion Formula: where  is such that . The convolution kernel  is referred to as Ramp filter in some literature.

Ill-posedness
Roughly speaking, then, the filter makes objects more singular. A quantitive statement of the ill-posedness of Radon inversion goes as follows:
where  is the previously defined adjoint to the Radon Transform.

Iterative reconstruction methods

Compared with the Filtered Back-projection method, iterative reconstruction costs large computation time, limiting its practical use. However, due to the ill-posedness of Radon Inversion, the Filtered Back-projection method may be infeasible in the presence of discontinuity or noise. Iterative reconstruction methods (e.g. iterative Sparse Asymptotic Minimum Variance) could provide metal artefact reduction, noise and dose reduction for the reconstructed result that attract much research interest around the world.

Inversion formulas

Explicit and computationally efficient inversion formulas for the Radon transform and its dual are available. The Radon transform in  dimensions can be inverted by the formula: where , and the power of the Laplacian  is defined as a pseudo-differential operator if necessary by the Fourier transform: For computational purposes, the power of the Laplacian is commuted with the dual transform  to give: where  is the Hilbert transform with respect to the s variable.  In two dimensions, the operator  appears in image processing as a ramp filter. One can prove directly from the Fourier slice theorem and change of variables for integration that for a compactly supported continuous function  of two variables: Thus in an image processing context the original image  can be recovered from the 'sinogram' data  by applying a ramp filter (in the  variable) and then back-projecting. As the filtering step can be performed efficiently (for example using digital signal processing techniques) and the back projection step is simply an accumulation of values in the pixels of the image, this results in a highly efficient, and hence widely used, algorithm.

Explicitly, the inversion formula obtained by the latter method is: The dual transform can also be inverted by an analogous formula:

Radon transform in algebraic geometry

In algebraic geometry, a Radon transform (also known as the Brylinski–Radon transform) is constructed as follows.

Write

for the universal hyperplane, i.e., H consists of pairs (x, h) where x is a point in d-dimensional projective space  and h is a point in the dual projective space (in other words, x is a line through the origin in (d+1)-dimensional affine space, and h is a hyperplane in that space) such that x is contained in h.

Then the Brylinksi–Radon transform is the functor between appropriate derived categories of étale sheaves

The main theorem about this transform is that this transform induces an equivalence of the categories of perverse sheaves on the projective space and its dual projective space, up to constant sheaves.

See also 
 Periodogram
 Matched filter
 Deconvolution
 X-ray transform
 Funk transform
 The Hough transform, when written in a continuous form, is very similar, if not equivalent, to the Radon transform.
 Cauchy–Crofton theorem is a closely related formula for computing the length of curves in space.
 Fast Fourier transform

Notes

References

 ; Translation: .
 .
 .

Further reading

External links
 
 

Integral geometry
Integral transforms